Franco Fabrizi (15 February 1916 – 18 October 1995) was an Italian actor.

Life and career 
Son of a barber and a cinema cashier, Franco Fabrizi started his career as a model and an actor in fotoromanzi. Fabrizi also starred on several revues and stage works, then he debuted on the big screen with a supporting role in Chronicle of a Love (Cronaca di un amore) (1950), Michelangelo Antonioni's long film debut.

The role that made him known was as Fausto in Federico Fellini's I vitelloni; from then he was inextricably linked to the character of a full-time seducer, a young wastrel, a young not-so-young man who refuses to grow up, a character that he reprised, with different facets, in a great number of films. Past the 1950s, Fabrizi was mainly relegated to character roles in Italian, French and Spanish minor productions; he still appeared on several major works of Italian cinema, and one of his last great roles was in Luchino Visconti's Death in Venice.

In 1993 he had a serious car accident. During his recovery, he was diagnosed with colon cancer, from which he died in 1995.

Selected filmography

Chronicle of a Love (Cronaca di un amore) Michelangelo Antonioni) (1950) – Fashion show presentator
The Mistress of Treves (1952)
La donna che inventò l'amore (1952)
 They Were Three Hundred (1952) – Pisacane
Heroic Charge (1952) – Captain Franchi
Ragazze da marito (1952) – Claudio Fortis
Prisoner in the Tower of Fire (1952)
I Vitelloni (Federico Fellini) (1953) – Fausto Moretti
The Pagans (1953) – Fanfulla Da Lodi
Vortice (1953) – Viaggiani
Cristo è passato sull'aia (1953) – Giovanni
Torna! (1954) – Giacomo Marini
Schiava del peccato (1954) – Carlo
Nel gorgo del peccato (1954) – Filippo
Woman of Rome (La romana) (Dino Risi) (1954) – Gino
Camilla (1954) – Gianni Rinaldi
Siluri umani (1954) – Antonio
 Farewell, My Beautiful Lady (1954) – Marco
Le amiche (Michelangelo Antonioni) (1955) – Cesare Pedoni, the architect
Il bidone (Federico Fellini) (1955) – Roberto
Racconti romani (1955) – Alvaro Latini
Calabuch (Luis García Berlanga) (1956) – Langosta
Peccato di castità (1956)
Noi siamo le colonne (1956) – Aldo
La donna del giorno (1956) – Aldo
Nights of Cabiria (Federico Fellini) (1957) – Giorgio (uncredited)
No Sun in Venice (1957) – Busetti
Una pelliccia di visone (1957) – Francipane
 Anyone Can Kill Me (1957) – Karl Herman
Husbands in the City (1957) – Alberto De Carlo
È arrivata la parigina (1958) – Nick
Adorabili e bugiarde (1958) – Geronti
Le dritte (1958) – Amleto Bettini
Mogli pericolose (1958) – Bruno
Racconti d'estate (1958) – Sandro Morandi
Anche l'inferno trema (1958)
Addio per sempre! (1958) – Mike
Un témoin dans la ville (1959) – Lambert – le radio-taxi de nuit
The Moralist (1959) – Giovanni
Wild Cats on the Beach (1959) – Nicola Ferrara
The Nights of Lucretia Borgia (1959) – Cesare Borgia
The Black Chapel (1959) – Graf Emanuele Rossi
 The Facts of Murder (1959) – Massimo Valdarena
Le sorprese dell'amore (1959) – Battista Crispi
I Genitori in Blue-Jeans (1960) – Gianni
Via Margutta (1960) – Giosuè Corsetti
Le svedesi (1960) – Franco
La moglie di mio marito (1961) – Giorgio Hintermann
The Wastrel (1961) – Rudi Veronese
Three Faces of Sin (1961) – Philippe Guerbois
Orazi e curiazi (1961) – Curazio
A Difficult Life (Una Vita Difficile) (Dino Risi) (1961) – Franco Simonini
Quattro notti con Alba (1962) – Lieutenant Zecchini
Una domenica d'estate (1962) – Giacomo
Night Train to Milan (1962) – L'uomo snob
Copacabana Palace (1962)
La donna degli altri è sempre più bella (1963) – Paolo (segment "Bagnino Lover")
Rat Trap (1963) – Paul
Storm Over Ceylon (1963) – Manuel Da Costa
Casablanca, Nest of Spies (1963) – Barón Max von Stauffen
Gli onorevoli (1963) – Roberto Cicconetti
The Commandant (1963) – Sandrelli
I maniaci (1964) – Stipa, the Insolent Employee (segment "Lo sport")
I complessi (1965) – Francesco Martello (segment "Guglielmo il Dentone")
Io la conoscevo bene (Antonio Pietrangeli) (1965) – Paganelli
Le reflux (1965)
The Birds, the Bees and the Italians (Signore e signori) (Pietro Germi) (1966) – Lino Benedetti
El misterioso señor Van Eyck (1966)
Una questione d'onore (1966) – Egidio Porcu
Vacanze sulla neve (1966)
Le facteur s'en va-t-en guerre (1966) – Ritoni
Che notte ragazzi! (1966) – D. Luis
 The Viscount (1967) – Ramon
Bang Bang (1967) – Mario Raffaelli
Anyone Can Play (1968) – Luisa's lover
Le Petit Baigneur (1968) – Marcello Cacciaperotti
Madigan's Millions (1968) – Condon
Sissignore (1968) – Chauffeur
Satyricon (1969) – Ascilto
L'homme orchestre (1970) – Franco Buzzini – le fiancé de Françoise
A Pocketful of Chestnuts (1970) – Bernardi
Death in Venice (Morte a Venezia) (Luchino Visconti) (1971) – Barber
Roma Bene (1971) – Nino Rappi
Stanza 17-17 palazzo delle tasse, ufficio imposte (1971) – Prince Gondrano Pantegani del Cacco
Il provinciale (1971) – Colombo
Panhandle 38 (1972) – Fernand
La Polizia ringrazia (1972) – Francesco Bettarini
Shadows Unseen (1972) – Commissioner Resta
La Mala ordina (1972) – Enrico Moroni
Il generale dorme in piedi (1972) – Col. Beltrami
La torta in cielo (1973)
La signora è stata violentata (1973) – Il fotografo
Società a responsabilità molto limitata (1973) – Don Celestino
La notte dell'ultimo giorno (1973) – Sergio Varzi
Ancora una volta prima di lasciarci (1973) – Marco
Touche pas à la femme blanche (Marco Ferreri) (1974) – Tom
What Have They Done to Your Daughters? (1974) – Franco De Rosa
La polizia chiede aiuto (1974) – Bruno Paglia
Killer Cop (1975) – Luigi Balsamo
Night Train Murders (Aldo Lado) (1975) – The Voyeur on the Train
Act of Aggression (1975) – Sauguet
The Flower in His Mouth (1975) – Dottore Sanguedolce
La verginella (1975)
Stato interessante (1977) – Gaetano La Monica (second story)
L'affaire Suisse (1978) – Poschetti
Action (1980) – The Producer
Habibi, amor mío (1981)
A Proper Scandal (1984) – Count Guarienti
Mi faccia causa (1984)
Ginger and Fred (1986) – Show host
Giovanni Senzapensieri (1986) – Gino
Grandi magazzini (1986) – Ing. Zambuti
The Little Devil (Il piccolo diavolo) (Roberto Benigni) (1988) – Monsignore
Un uomo di razza (1989) – Radames
Ricky & Barabba (1992) – Salvetti (final film role)

References

External links

1916 births
1995 deaths
Italian male film actors
Deaths from cancer in Emilia-Romagna
Deaths from colorectal cancer
People from the Province of Piacenza
Italian male stage actors
20th-century Italian male actors
Ciak d'oro winners